The 2001 About-Picard law [abu pika:r], officially Law No. 2001-504 of June 12, 2001, aimed at strengthening the prevention and repression of sectarian movements that undermine human rights and fundamental freedoms (fr: loi n° 2001-504 du 12 juin 2001 tendant à renforcer la prévention et la répression des mouvements sectaires portant atteinte aux droits de l'homme et aux libertés fondamentales) is a controversial piece of French legislation, which broadly speaking, makes it possible to act against organisations when such organisations have become involved in certain crimes. The law is targeted at sects and movements deemed cultic (mouvements sectaires) that "undermine human rights and fundamental freedoms", as well as "mental manipulation". The law has caused controversy internationally, with some commentators alleging that it infringes on religious freedom while proponents contend that it reinforces religious freedom.

Background on government and religion in France 

Freedom of religion and separation of church and state have formed part of the French idea of the state since at least the French Revolution and in some ways long before, since the 16th-century period of the Reformation and of the Wars of Religion. Separation of religion and state in France takes the form of laïcité, by which political power avoids interference in the sphere of religious dogma, and religion avoids interference in public policies. The French understand "freedom of religion" primarily as the freedom of the individual to believe or not to believe what any religion teaches. Also, because of a long history of one single dominating church (the Catholic Church), the French state sees its duty less in protecting religion from state interference than in protecting the individual from interference by religion.

In the wake of the Order of the Solar Temple murders and suicides, the French Parliament established the Parliamentary Commission on Cults in France to investigate cults. In December 1995 the Commission delivered a report on cults which caused much controversy, some of it due to a list extracted from a report by the French National Police on purported cults. (The Commission assimilated information and analysis from the French police secret service, the Renseignements généraux.)

Following the recommendations of the report, Prime Minister Alain Juppé set up in 1996 the "Interministerial board of observation of sects", followed in 1998 by the "Interministerial Mission in the Fight Against Sects" (MILS). In 2002 the "Interministerial Monitoring Mission Against Sectarian Abuses" (MIVILUDES) replaced MILS.

Other action of the French government against potential abuses by cults resulted in the passing of the About-Picard law.

The About-Picard law

Commentators often refer to the Law 2001-504 of June 12, 2001 as the About-Picard law, from the name of its rapporteurs (parliamentarians who report upon the draft law), senator Nicolas About (UDF center-right party) and deputy Catherine Picard (PS center-left party).

The French parliament adopted the law with broad cross-party support under the government of center-right president Jacques Chirac and socialist prime minister Lionel Jospin.

Article 223-15-2 of Penal code:(Act no. 2001-504 of June 12, 2001, article 10 Official Journal of June 13, 2001 ; Ordinance No. 2000-916 of September 19, 2000, article 3 Official Journal of September 22, 2000, into force January 1, 2002) 
       
« Fraudulently abusing the ignorance or state of weakness of a minor, or of a person whose particular vulnerability, due to age, sickness, infirmity, to a physical or psychological disability or to pregnancy, is apparent or known to the offender, or abusing a person in a state of physical or psychological dependency resulting from serious or repeated pressure or from techniques used to affect his judgement, in order to induce the minor or other person to act or abstain from acting in any way seriously harmful to him, is punished by three years' imprisonment and a fine of €375,000.
Where the offence is committed by the legal or de facto manager of a group that carries out activities the aim or effect of which is to create, maintain or exploit the psychological or physical dependency of those who participate in them, the penalty is increased to five years' imprisonment and to a fine of €750,000. »

The additional penalties that natural or legal persons may incur are mentioned in the following articles 223-15-3 and 4.

Main points 
Notable new points introduced by the law include:
 In the case of certain crimes, the law extends legal responsibility from individuals to organizations (corporations, associations, and other legal entities...).
 Courts can order the dissolution of organizations if they or their executives have been found guilty of these crimes.
 
The initial draft of the About-Picard law included the criminalization of "mental manipulation". Many organizations criticised this clause for its vagueness.  Minister of Justice Élisabeth Guigou pushed for the removal of this clause, which the legislators excluded from the final version of the law. However, the law makes it a crime to defraud a person weakened by illness, old age, etc., but also of a person in a state of psychological or physical subjection resulting from grave or reiterated pressures or techniques able to alter judgement.

Application of the law 
There was one famous application of the law since its adoption: that of Arnaud Mussy, leader of the tiny Néo-Phare (New Lighthouse) cult. Mussy, who claims that he is the Christ, had announced imminent apocalypse, resulting in the suicide of one of his followers and the attempted suicides of two others, who were severely wounded in 2001. The criminal court in Nantes sentenced him to three years in prison and 90,000 FF damages in November 2004. It ruled that he had "abused fraudulently the state of ignorance and weakness of several persons in the state of bodily or mental dependence". A higher court in Rennes confirmed the sentence in July 2005.

Criticism of the Law 
See Status of religious freedom in France for expressed concerns about other aspects of French policies with respect to minority religions.

The French government, when challenged on issues of religious discrimination, states that it has no concern in any way with religious doctrine per se. The government has taken the position that it will deal with the concrete consequences of cult affiliation, especially with respect to children. The government sees this as particularly important in the light of past abuse committed in some criminal cults, such as sexual slavery and mass suicide.  According to government sources, none of the criteria listed in related government documents on sects discuss theology; they only focus on the actions and the methods of the groups.

Critics of the law see this as merely a semantic change  and maintain that no empirical studies support claims of the use of techniques of coercive persuasion by NRMs.

Reactions inside France 

The Bishop of Soissons, Marcel Herriot, defended the law on June 25, 2000, asserting it was necessary to protect by law persons, family, society and religions themselves from sects that are violating fundamental freedoms and human dignity.

Some groups claim that the Parliamentary Reports and the controversy surrounding the About-Picard law have created an unhealthy atmosphere, resulting in minority religious groups suffering from excessively strict, uneven, or even abusive discrimination in the application of other laws by local authorities. For example, the group Coordination des Associations et Particuliers pour la Liberté de Conscience (Co-ordination of Associations and Individuals for Freedom of Conscience) requested the repeal of the law, asserting laws should not specify groups as "sectarian" or "cultic" as, in a democracy. However, an OSCE report has described this group as a partisan 

The umbrella association of French Jehovah's Witnesses sued the French government in the ECHR in case #53430/99, alleging that the publication of the parliamentary reports and the enactment of the About-Picard law infringed its civil rights. The court rejected the application.

In other cases (#53934/00), the Court affirmed that the publication of a Parliamentary Report disparaging to some groups did not constitute an infringement of human rights, even though these groups were not given a legal recourse for the removal of their name from the report.

Human rights activists dubbed the law "un délit d'opinion" (a thought crime).

Statements by the Council of Europe 

Forty different religious and human-rights groups submitted a petition to the Council of Europe's Parliamentary Assembly. This petition led to a report (Report 9612 of the Committee on Legal Affairs and Human Rights of Europe) containing an expert paper by Swiss professor Joseph Voyame, who concluded:
"On the basis of the foregoing, I conclude that the French Law of 12 June 2001 is not incompatible with the Council of Europe’s values."
Voyame deduces that the law clearly responds to a need, that the measure of dissolution appears radical, but also effective and reliable, and that judicial guarantees surround it. He also discusses the title with its mentioning of "cultic groups", but comes to the conclusion that the uncertainty regarding the definition has little importance:

The title is undeniably part of the [Act], but has no legislative authority in itself. Although it may be useful for the purposes of interpretation, it cannot be used in making a ruling that runs counter to a clear legal provision ... . As we will see, [Sections] 1, 19 and 20 of this [Act] identify the targeted incorporated organizations and groups with the greatest possible precision. It is these standard-setting texts that are decisive.

The report discussed several objections regarding the word "secte" (cult):

... the word ‘sect’ has taken on an extremely pejorative connotation. In the eyes of the public, it stigmatises movements whose activities are dangerous either for their members or for society. Today, the world contains dozens, perhaps even hundreds, of groups both large and small, all with various beliefs and observances, which are not necessarily dangerous or prejudicial to freedom. It is true that among these groups are some which have committed criminal acts. Nevertheless, the existence of a few dangerous movements is not enough to condemn all the rest (...)

The report concluded:

The act for the most part simply reiterates existing provisions in the Criminal Code, the Code of Consumption, the Code of Public Health and the New Code of Civil Procedure and does so for a precise purpose in conformity with the European Convention on Human Rights, as we have just seen. Consequently, even if it had been possible to achieve the same objective by recourse to existing provisions, there is nothing to prevent the passing of an act which has the advantage of grouping together all the provisions necessary to achieve that objective.

In November 2002, the Council of Europe passed a resolution inviting the Government of France to reconsider the About-Picard Law and to clarify certain terms in the law. It referred, however, to the Recommendation 1412 (1999) on the illegal activities of sects, where it had concluded that it was "essential to ensure that the activities of groups, whatever religious, esoteric or spiritual description they adopted, were in keeping with the principles of democratic societies and, in particular, the provisions of Article 9 of the European Convention on Human Rights (ECHR)." and it stated that "ultimately, should the case arise, it will be for the European Court of Human Rights, and it alone, to say whether or not this law is compatible with the European Convention on Human Rights." .

Reactions outside of France
In an open letter dated June 2000 to Alain Vivien about religious freedom in France, Aaron Rhodes, Executive Director of the International Helsinki Federation for Human Rights (IHFHR), wrote:

We question ourselves how such a law can claim to guarantee human rights when it goes against the rights of association, expression, religion and conscience; when it puts in danger the right of minorities and maintains prejudices that are so incompatible with the concept of tolerance intrinsic to that of human rights. France must deal with its responsibilities and obligations as a signatory for the International Conventions and respect the European laws and its interpretation by the Court of Strasbourg, before one of its citizens become a victim of discrimination due to the law which you propose.

Alain Vivien responded: "[The IHFHR] seems today to have passed into the hands of Scientologists and perhaps other transnational organizations". Aaron Rhodes then acknowledged that the Moscow office of the IHFHR had received funding from the Church of Scientology to print a leaflet about religious freedom in Russia, and voiced his astonishment at the charge. Rhodes voiced his embarrassment: "[...]for you and your fellow French citizens by your recourse to methods of denunciations and insinuations that remind us of those sometimes used by totalitarian and backward regimes."

Reaction of the government of the United States of America 
Some groups sought the help of their governments to fight what they saw as religious intolerance in France.  In the United States, the Church of Scientology utilised pressure groups against the French government, and had some success with the Clinton administration, which repeatedly brought the matter before the French government.

According to pastor Jean-Arnold de Clermont, head of the French Protestant federation and himself a strong critic of the first draft of the law, the complaints originating in the United States concerning religious freedom in France were largely based on biased, poor information.

According to a newspaper article published in The Guardian in June 2000, the French government considered American interference regarding religious freedom in France as unwarranted meddling by the US government in France's internal affairs. Paul Webster wrote that President Jacques Chirac told Clinton that religious freedom would no longer be a subject for bilateral presidential talks, "in the light of what has been officially described as 'shocking' White House support for Scientologists and Moonies". The French government also described the  United States Congress's introduction of laws protecting religious freedom internationally as "an unacceptable intrusion into internal affairs". Alain Vivien, former chairman of the French ministerial mission to combat the influence of cults (MILS), and the president of the Centre Contre les Manipulations Mentales (Centre Against Mental Manipulation), said many observers believed that Clinton was making his peace with big religious movements, "because they offer an indispensable source of political financing", and that with the help of Scientologists, cults were infiltrating UN and European human rights associations and collaborating on virulent reports against France's policies.

The French did not alter their law following these requests; and the claims and actions of the US government regarding the religious situation in France largely ceased with the Bush administration.

Some critics of French legislation have voiced concerns that countries which do not have the same legal safeguards and constitutional rights as France may emulate this legislation. In the words of a US official:

Yet the law itself remains problematic not only because of the threat the language carries in France, but because it is even now being considered for emulation by countries that lack France’s commitment to rule of law and human rights. Such a model serves only too well as cover for those nations who persecute under the guise of law enforcement.

On September 15, 2006, the United States Bureau of Democracy, Human Rights, and Labor released a report on religious freedom in France. This report noted that "The constitution provides for freedom of religion, and the Government generally respected this right in practice." It reported mostly anonymous concerns over repression of religious freedom in France, notably in regards to what the report referred to in one case as "cult groups", as well as the law banning religious symbols in schools, and rising anti-semitism in France.

See also 
Parliamentary Commission about Cults in France (1995)
Anti-cult movement
MIVILUDES
Freedom of Religion in France

Footnotes

References and further reading

Official French government publications 

 French Parliamentary Commission of investigation of Cults activities (1995)
 Jean-Louis Langlais (MIVILUDES), Les dérives sectaires, année 2004 : rapport au Premier ministre, 2005, page, PDF,  RTF
 Jean-Louis Langlais (MIVILUDES), Les dérives sectaires, année 2003 : rapport au Premier ministre, 2004, page, PDF
 Mission interministérielle de lutte contre les sectes : rapport 2001, 2002, page, PDF, RTF
 Jacques Guyard, Jean-Pierre Brard, Rapport fait au nom de la Commission d'enquête sur la situation financière, patrimoniale et fiscale des sectes, ainsi que sur leurs activités économiques et leurs relations avec les milieux économiques et financiers, French National Assembly, page
 Conseil d'État, Rapport public 2004. Jurisprudence et avis de 2003. Un siècle de laïcité, PDF,

Opinions
 Baker, Eileen, Religious Movements: Cult and Anticult Since Jonestown, Annual Review of Sociology, Vol. 12: pp. 329–346, 1986
 Introvigne, Massimo and Richardson, James T., "Western Europe, Postmodernity, and the Shadow of the French Revolution: A Response to Soper and Robbins", Symposium on Government Policy Toward Unconventional Religions in Europe, Journal for the Scientific Study of Religion, Vol. 40 I.2 p. 181, June 2001
 Introvigne, Massimo. & Richardson, James T., "Brainwashing" Theories in European Parliamentary and Administrative Reports on "Cults" and "Sects, Symposium on Government Policy Toward Unconventional Religions in Europe, Journal for the Scientific Study of Religion, Vol. 40 I.2 p. 43, June 2001
 Palmer, Susan J. The secte Response to Religious Discrimination: Subversives, Martyrs, or Freedom Fighters in the French Sect Wars?, article published in the book edited by Phillip Charles Lucas and Thomas Robbins: New Religious Movements in the 21st Century published by Routledge (2004) 
 Wybraniec, John & Finke Roger, Religious Regulation and the Courts: The Judiciary's Changing Role in Protecting Minority Religions from Majoritarian Rule, Journal for the Scientific Study of Religion, Vol.40 I.3 p. 427, September 2001
 Bruno Fouchereau: Secular society at stake. Europe resists American cults (Monde diplomatique, June 2001)
 Marci Hamilton: Why the U.S.'s International Religious Freedom Commission Is Harming Its Status In the World Community
 Dominique Decherf: French Views of Religious Freedom
 Stephen A. Kent: The French and German versus American Debate Over New Religions, Scientology, and Human Rights
 Robert Jacques: Religious liberty and French secularism
 Marci Hamilton: Why the U.S.'s International Religious Freedom Commission Is Harming Its Status In the World Community

Official French legal texts 
All texts in French.
 Law 2001-504 of June 12, 2001 (unofficial translation into English)
 Law of 1901 relative to associations (updated version)
 Law of 1905 regarding the separation of church and state (updated version)
 Penal code (legislation part; updated version)

Official French government sites and reports 
All texts in French.
 MIVILUDES
 Vivien Report 1983
 Gent-Guyard Report 1995 (French) unofficial translation
 Guyard Report 1999, Cults and money
 The 2003 report of the French Mission on Cultic Deviances MIVILUDES unofficial translation

Council of Europe 
 Council of Europe: Resolution 1309 (2002) Freedom of religion and religious minorities in France
 Council of Europe: Recommendation 1412 (1999) Illegal activities of sects
 Doc. 9612 Freedom of religion and religious minorities in France

Critique
France and Religious Intolerance Index of documents at the International Helsinki Federation for Human Rights
Discussion of MIVILUDES (bulletin of the French Protestant Federation)
Discussion of the About-Picard law (bulletin of the French Protestant Federation)
Discussion of the About-Picard law (French League of Human Rights)
Report On Discrimination Against Spiritual And Therapeutical Minorities In France, by the Coordination des Associations & Particuliers pour la Liberté de Conscience
French Legislature Passes Law Suppressing Religions by Joava Good, President of the International Foundation for Human Rights and Tolerance.
Church Of Scientology Humans Rights office in France
Administrative Barriers Obstruct Evangelical Growth in France Christian Today, February 9, 2005
 "No sects, please - we're French" by Prof. Susan Palmer (Dawson College and Concordia University) (contains criticism of nonexistent dispositions of the law)

The "Viviengate" — a criticism of Alain Vivien's action (in French)

Law of France
2001 in law
Law about religion in France
2001 in France
Freedom of religion
Government opposition to new religious movements
Political repression in France